The Transport and the Environment report, published in 1994, was the 18th report published by the Royal Commission on Environmental Pollution. It provided a detailed and comprehensive study of the environmental impact of transport in the United Kingdom and was chaired by Sir John Houghton. The New Scientist commented "Rarely, if ever, can a ministry have emerged so badly from an official report as John MacGregor's old department", in an article titled "Head-on collision over transport: The British government has received its sternest warning yet that its unflagging support for the car is seriously at odds with its own green principles".

See also
Roads for Prosperity
Roads in the United Kingdom

References

External links
Transport and the Environment (1994) Full report

British Royal Commissions
Transport policy in the United Kingdom